August and Everything After: Live at Town Hall is a live album and video by Counting Crows. The DVD and Blu-ray Disc versions represent the first official live concert video release of the band's career.

Release
The concert was released on DVD and Blu-ray Disc video formats, as well as in album form on CD and LP, on August 30, 2011, in the United States. The album was also made available via digital download through Amazon.com and iTunes one day earlier.

Songs
The live concert was recorded at Town Hall in New York City on September 18, 2007. It features a performance of the band's 1993 commercial debut album, August and Everything After, in its entirety. The band performed the songs in the exact track list order featured on the album, except for the inclusion of lyrics of the song "Raining in Baltimore" in their performance of their hit single "Round Here".

Track listing
All songs written by Adam Duritz unless otherwise noted.

"Round Here"* (Duritz, Dave Janusko, Dan Jewett, Chris Roldan, David Bryson) – 11:42
"Omaha" – 3:43
"Mr. Jones" (Duritz, Bryson) – 6:19
"Introduction to Perfect Blue Buildings" – 1:12
"Perfect Blue Buildings"* – 5:05
"Anna Begins" (Duritz, Bryson, Marty Jones, Toby Hawkins, Lydia Holly) – 5:34
"Time and Time Again" (Duritz, Bryson, Charlie Gillingham, Steve Bowman, Don Dixon) – 5:50
"Rain King"* (Duritz, Bryson) – 8:57
"Introduction to Sullivan Street" – 2:25
"Sullivan Street" (Duritz, Bryson) – 8:42
"Ghost Train" – 5:54
"A Murder of One"* (Duritz, Bryson, Matt Malley) – 11:07

* Track #1 includes lyrics of the song "Raining in Baltimore" and the Sordid Humor song "Private Archipelago".
* Track #5 includes lyrics of the song "Miller's Angels" and the Prince song "Sometimes it Snows in April".
* Track #8 includes lyrics of the Bruce Springsteen song "Thunder Road".'* Track #12 includes lyrics of the U2 song "Red Hill Mining Town" and the Sordid Humor song "Dorris Day".''

Personnel
Jim Bogios – drums, vocals, and percussion
David Bryson – electric guitar, acoustic guitar, and vocals
Adam Duritz – vocals
Charlie Gillingham – piano, Hammond B-3 organ, accordion, harmonica, and vocals
David Immergluck – electric guitar, acoustic guitar, mandolin, pedal steel, and vocals
Millard Powers – bass, vocals, and piano
Dan Vickrey – electric guitar, acoustic guitar, banjo, and vocals

References

External links

Counting Crows live albums
2011 live albums
2011 video albums
Live video albums
Eagle Rock Records live albums
Eagle Rock Records video albums
Albums recorded at the Town Hall
Counting Crows video albums